The Grup Taktikal Khas (GTK or Special Tactical Group) is an elite counter terrorism unit for the Malaysian Immigration Department.

History 
The team was formed to raise the capability and ability of the Immigration Department of Malaysia, in conducting high-risk raids and very tough special operation. The unit was officially established in January 2014 as a part of Immigration Department of Malaysia. The state of Negeri Sembilan became the team's location. The first Commanding Officer of this team is Faizal Fazri Othman, who is also The Immigration Director of Negeri Sembilan State, and the first Operation Leader of the team is Roslan Bin Mat Sahad. The other operators are not revealed to the public.

Operations 
GTK is deployed in a high-risk, special operation where a 'special capability' is needed, or the task are unable to be executed by a normal operation unit of the department due to the complexity of the operation. GTK are operational for up to 10 days in any location in Malaysia in any geographical structure.

Thus, the main focus of the team are fighting well-organised syndicates related to the Immigration Act 1959/63, Anti Trafficking in Person and Anti Smuggling of Migrants Act (ATIPSOM 2007), Passport Act 1966, and other transnational/transborder crime syndicates.

Recruitment and training 
The Special Tactical Group Assessment and Selection Program consists of two selection modes: the Camp Mode and the Jungle Mode. These two modes had been executed at Labu, Negeri Sembilan and Asahan Camp, Malacca and the best of 9 from 64 candidates were selected to join the first nucleus of the team.

Weapons and Equipment

Weaponry 
 : Heckler & Koch USP Compact, 9 mm
 : Remington 870, 12 bore

Equipment 
 SPECTRA helmet
 Body padding protector
 Tactical Goggles
 Level III Kevlar vest
 Rope Operation Equipment (Static Rope (Black), Tactical Carabiner (Black), Fig of Eight (Black), etc.)
 Local map Scale of 1:63360 and other navigation equipment
 Breacher, Shotgun, OxyAcethylene Cutter for Silent Entry / Force Entry
 Personal Multiple Channel Localized Radio
 Government Integrated Radio Network (GIRN) Radio
 Tactical Ladder
 Bushnell Night Vision Gen-II
 Two tactical vehicles

See also 
 List of special police units

References 

Organizations established in 2014
2014 establishments in Malaysia
Specialist law enforcement agencies of Malaysia
Non-military counterterrorist organizations